The New Haven Colony was a small English colony in New England from 1638 to 1664 primarily in parts of what is now the state of Connecticut, but also with outposts in modern-day New York, New Jersey, Pennsylvania, and Delaware.

The history of the colony was a series of disappointments and failures. The most serious problem was that New Haven colony never had a charter giving it legal title to exist.  The larger, stronger colony of Connecticut to the north did have a charter, and Connecticut was aggressive in using its military superiority to force a takeover.  New Haven had other weaknesses, as well.  The leaders were businessmen and traders, but they were never able to build up a large or profitable trade because their agricultural base was poor, farming the rocky soil was difficult, and the location was isolated.  New Haven's political system was confined to church members only, and the refusal to widen it alienated many people.

Oliver Cromwell recommended that the New Haven colonists all migrate to Ireland or to Spanish territories that he planned to conquer, but the Puritans of New Haven were committed to their new land.  One by one in 1662–64, the towns joined Connecticut Colony until only three were left, and they submitted to Connecticut in 1664. It then became the city of New Haven, from which other modern towns in the New Haven region were later split off.

Founding
In 1637, a group of London merchants and their families moved to Boston with the intention of creating a new settlement.  The leaders were John Davenport, a Puritan minister, and Theophilus Eaton, a wealthy merchant who brought £3000 to the venture. Both had experience in fitting out vessels for the Massachusetts Bay Company. The two ships that they chartered arrived in Boston on June 26, 1637. They learned about the area around the Quinnipiac River from militia engaged in the Pequot War, so Eaton set sail to view the area in late August. The site seemed ideal for trade, with a good port lying between Boston and the Dutch city of New Amsterdam on Manhattan and good access to the furs of the Connecticut River valley settlements of Hartford and Springfield.

Eaton returned to Boston, leaving seven men to remain through the winter and make preparations for the arrival of the rest of the company. The main body of settlers landed on April 14, 1638, numbering about 250, with the addition of some from Massachusetts. A number of the early dwellings were caves or "cellers", partially underground and carved into hillsides.

The settlers had no official charter. Channing says that they were squatters, whereas Atwater holds that a land purchase from the local natives had been effected sometime before their arrival in April, although no written deed was signed until November 24, 1638. A second deed was made December 11, 1638 for a tract north of the first purchase. The Indian deed of Wepowauge (Milford) was executed February 12, 1639, and that of Menunkatuck (Guilford) on September 29, 1639.

William Peck (1601-1694) was one of the original proprietors of New Haven in 1638, his autograph signature being affixed to the fundamental Agreement or Constitution dated June 4, 1639, for the government of the infant colony.  This is said to have been one of "the first examples in history of a written constitution organizing a government and defining its powers."

Fundamental Agreement
On October 25, 1639, the colonists adopted a "Fundamental Agreement" for self-government, partly as a result of a similar action in the Connecticut Colony. According to its terms, a court composed of 16 burgesses, i.e. voting citizens, was established to appoint a magistrate and officials and to conduct the business of the plantation. The only eligible voters were "planters" who were members of "some or other of the approved Churches of New England". This excluded indentured servants, temporary residents, and transient persons, who were considered to have no permanent interest in the community.

They further determined "that the word of God shall be the only rule to be attended unto in ordering the affairs of government in this plantation." Theophilus Eaton was chosen as the first Magistrate. As the Bible contains no reference to trial by jury, the colonists eliminated it and the magistrate sat in judgment.

The leaders attempted numerous merchandising enterprises, but they all failed.  Much of the money went into a great ship sent to London in 1646, with £5000 in a cargo of grain and beaver hides.  It never arrived. Minister Davenport was an Oxford-educated intellectual, and he set up a grammar school, Hopkins School as a step toward establishing a college.  Yale College was opened in 1701, long after his death.

Formation of New Haven Colony 
The Plantation soon had neighboring settlements established by other groups of Puritans from England. Additional independent towns (called plantations) were established adjacent to New Haven Plantation. Milford and Guilford were established in 1639, and Stamford in 1640. Southold on the North Fork of Long Island was established by settlers from New Haven in 1640. 

On October 23, 1643, in the context of the formation of the New England Confederation, composed of Massachusetts Bay, Plymouth and Connecticut Colonies, for joint military action against threats of attack by natives, the New Haven Plantation and its subsidiary settlements, Stamford and Southhold on Long Island, were combined with the independent towns of Milford and Guilford and named the New Haven Colony which then joined the Confederation. The town of Branford was settled in 1644 by residents from Wethersfield, Connecticut Colony, who were dissatisfied with the theocratic rule there. They joined the New Haven Colony. Eaton served as governor of the new colony until his death in 1658.

New Jersey, Philadelphia, and the Pacific Ocean 
In 1641, the colony claimed the area that is now South Jersey and Philadelphia after buying land south of Trenton along the Delaware River from the Lenape tribe.  Cape May, New Jersey and Salem, New Jersey were among the communities that were founded.

The treaty with the Lenape placed no westward limit on the land west of the Delaware, which became the legal basis for a Connecticut "sea to sea" claim of owning all the land on both sides of the Delaware from the Atlantic Ocean to the Pacific Ocean.  This set the stage for the Pennamite-Yankee War of 150 years later.

In 1642, 50 families on a ship captained by George Lamberton settled at the mouth of Schuylkill River to establish the trading post at what is today Philadelphia.  The Dutch and Swedes who were already in the area burned their buildings, and a court in New Sweden convicted Lamberton of "trespassing, conspiring with the Indians." The New Haven Colony did not get any support from its New England patrons, and Puritan Governor John Winthrop testified that the "Delaware Colony" "dissolved" owing to "sickness and mortality."

The Phantom Ship 
Initially, the colony had only ships capable of coastal travel, and trade with England was done with the Massachusetts Bay Colony as the middleman.  In 1645, the colony built an 80-ton ocean-going ship to be captained by George Lamberton of New Haven, a merchant gentleman and a sea captain from London. He and others had tried to establish a settlement in Delaware, but they were resisted by the Swedes who had settled there. He was one of the original founders of the Colony of New Haven. He was allotted land in block 7 and owned over 266 acres. Captain Lamberton and others from New Haven built one of the first ships out of New England for a commercial venture to the West Indies. The disaster in Philadelphia, combined with sinking of its only Atlantic ship, weakened the New Haven colony's future negotiating position.

The ship disappeared in 1646, and its fate is the theme of Henry Wadsworth Longfellow's 1847 poem "The Phantom Ship". According to Longfellow's poem, an apparition of the ship appeared on the horizon following a June thunder shower near sunset six months after it disappeared.  Those on shore were said to have recognized their friends on deck. The ship's masts then appeared to snap, the ship pitched, the passengers were thrown into the sea, and the ship capsized. The poem concludes that the vision  was sent to "quiet their troubled spirits" and the event gave the town closure.

A ship sailed from New Haven,
And the keen and frosty airs,
That filled her sails at parting,
Were heavy with good men's prayers.
"O Lord! if it be thy pleasure"—
Thus prayed the old divine—
"To bury our friends in the ocean,
Take them, for they are thine!"
But Master Lamberton muttered,
And under his breath said he,
"This ship is so crank and walty
I fear our grave she will be!"

Pursuit of the regicide judges 
Eaton stayed as governor until his death in 1658, when leadership of the Colony was given to Francis Newman, followed by William Leete in 1660.

In 1661, the judges who had signed the death warrant of Charles I of England in 1649 were pursued by Charles II. Judges Colonel Edward Whalley and Colonel William Goffe both fled to New Haven to seek refuge from the king's forces, and John Davenport arranged for them to hide in the hills northwest of the town. They purportedly took refuge in Three Judges' Cave, a rock formation in West Rock park that today bears a historical marker in their name. Judge John Dixwell joined them at a later time.

Merger with Connecticut Colony 
New Haven urgently needed a Royal charter, but the colony had made enemies in London by hiding and protecting the regicide judges. An uneasy competition ruled New Haven's relations with the larger and more powerful Connecticut River settlements centered on Hartford. New Haven published a complete legal code in 1656, but the law remained very much church-centered.  A major difference between the New Haven and Connecticut colonies was that the Connecticut Colony permitted other churches to operate on the basis of "sober dissent", while the New Haven Colony only permitted the Puritan church to exist. A royal charter was issued to Connecticut in 1662, ending New Haven's period as a separate colony, and its towns were merged into the government of Connecticut Colony in 1664.

Many factors contributed to the loss of independence for New Haven, including the loss of her strongest governor in Eaton, the economic disasters of losing her only ocean-going ship, the Philadelphia disaster, and the regicide case.

Newark 

A group of New Haven colonists led by Robert Treat and others moved to establish a new community in New Jersey in 1666, seeking to maintain the Puritan religious exclusivism and theocracy that was lost with the New Haven Colony's merger with the more liberal Connecticut Colony. Treat wanted to name the new community after Milford, Connecticut. However Abraham Pierson was to urge that the new community be named "New Ark" or "New Work" which was to evolve into the name Newark, New Jersey.

See also 
 History of Connecticut
 Robert Seeley

Footnotes

Further reading

 Andrews, Charles M.  The Colonial Period of American History: The Settlements II (1936).
 Blue, Jon C. The Case of the Piglet's Paternity: Trials from the New Haven Colony, 1639–1663. Middletown, CT: Wesleyan University Press, 2015.
 Calder, Isabel M. The New Haven Colony New Haven, CT: Yale University Press, 1934.
 Clark, George Larkin. A History of Connecticut: Its People and Institutions. (1914).
 Lambert, Edward Rodolphus. [https://books.google.com/books?id=RBICAAAAYAAJ History of the Colony of New Haven: Before and After the Union with Connecticut. Containing a Particular Description of the Towns which Composed that Government, Viz. New Haven, Milford, Guilford, Branford, Stamford, & Southold, L. I., with a Notice of the Towns which Have Been Set Off from "the Original Six."] Hitchcock & Stafford, 1838.
 Little, Ann M. "Men on Top? The Farmer, the Minister, and Marriage in Early New England," Pennsylvania History'' (1997) vol 64  Special Issue, pp 123–150, based on records of New Haven Colony
 History and antiquities of New Haven (Conn.) from its earliest settlement to the present time (1831) 

English colonization of the Americas
Connecticut Colony
Province of New York
History of the Thirteen Colonies
Former English colonies
1637 establishments in the Thirteen Colonies
States and territories established in 1638
Colonial settlements in North America
1637 establishments in Connecticut